Ceramide synthase 5 (CerS5) is the enzyme encoded in humans by the CERS5 gene.

Function
CerS5 robustly synthesizes C16-ceramide, which is often considered to be an important pro-apoptotic ceramide. De novo ceramide synthesis is an essential trigger for Bax activation in hypoxia/reoxygenation. Following hypoxia/reoxygenation, CerS5 expression is elevated. Upon knocking down acid sphingomyelinase and CerS5 in NTERA-2 cells, Bax localization to mitochondria was reduced, indicating the importance of CerS5 activity in the apoptosis pathway.

Tissue distribution
CerS5 (TRH4) mRNA is found in all tissues and is strongly expressed in muscle and brain. CerS5 is the major ceramide synthase detected in lung epithelia. Knock-down research in respiratory epithelium using CerS5 siRNA or fumonisin B1 reduced total CerS activity by 45% or 78%, respectively, indicating that CerS5 indeed contributes significantly to ceramide synthesis in lung. In the brain, CerS5 mRNA is detected in most cells within the gray and white matter tissues.

Clinical significance
CerS5 sensitizes cells to the chemotherapeutic drugs doxorubicin and vincristine, but not to cisplatin or carboplatin.

A splice variant of CerS5 is expressed in lymphoma and other tumor cells and contribute to tumor recognition by the immune system. In response to upregulation of tumor suppressor protein p53, C16-ceramide levels were increased in leukemia and colon cancer cells, as were levels of CerS5 mRNA in the leukemia cells, but not in the colon cancer cells. For this reason, CerS5 looks like a promising target for the regulation of cancer and of cell death pathways.

References

Enzymes
Human proteins
Integral membrane proteins